is the second season of the anime series, Lady Lady!!, produced by Toei Animation Co., Ltd. It consists of a total of 36 episodes and was aired from May 12, 1988 to January 26, 1989 on TV Tokyo. Based on the Japanese shōjo manga Lady!!, by Youko Hanabusa.

Story
3 years after Lady!!, Lynn is starting a new life in her new home, living separately from her family. Her sister Sarah is living at her grandfather's place at Warbawn Castle, while her father works endlessly to earn money to take back the Marble Mansion. She is studying at Saint Patrick Academy, a distinguished school famous for horseback riding. Making friends, as well as rivals, along the way to attaining the prestigious honor, the Lady Crest. With her noble steed Andrews, will they overcome obstacles that come in their way to reach their goal? And can Lynn come back to her old home?

Characters

Lynn is a cheerful and friendly 8-year-old girl who slowly wins the affections of the people around her. She is a first-year student at Saint Patrick Academy and a member of equestrian club. When she befriends the unruly horse, Andrews, she becomes the center of attention of the town, as well as the object of ire and envy of her schoolmates who are eying the Lady Crest.

Andrews is an Arabian horse. He has characteristically bay or chestnut in color. He was formerly Vivian's steed. He has a fear of squirrels. He inherited his marvelous skills from his mother, Gloria.

She is Lynn's older half sister. After losing the Marble Mansion, she is now living at the Warbawn Castle, her grandfather's place. Kind and caring, she is often concerned of her younger sister's well-being. Despite living separately, she and Lynn still share a strong bond. They both have golden heart-shaped lockets given to them by their father, the Viscount Marble. In the locket is a picture of the three of them as well as the words engraved that characterize a true Lady: Merciful, Courageous, and Noble. As a skilled flutist, she has a tendency to play the flute whenever she is troubled or in deep thought, and sometimes to comfort her grandfather.

He is Lynn and Sarah's father. After losing the Marble Mansion, George is working hard to pay all of his debts and regain it from the bank. He is frequently away but loves his children dearly.

Misuzu was Lynn's deceased mother. She died in a car crash three years ago. She appears in her dreams to encourage her whenever she is downhearted.

Arthur is the eldest son and heir of the noble Brighton family. He is in love with Sarah.

Edward is Arthur's younger brother and Lynn's childhood friend. He is a student of Winston Churchill Academy. Good-looking and a skilled equestrian, Edward is the object of Vivian's affections . However, he is in love with Lynn.

She is the Countess at Montgomery Mansion where Lynn is living at.

Hailing from France, Sophie is the granddaughter of Countess Montgomery. At the beginning of the series, she puts up a sweet and innocent facade while scheming to put Lynn in a bad light in order to ensure that the Countess' inheritance will go to her family. She loves her mother dearly and does what it takes to please her even though she knows that actions against Lynn were wrong. Fear of being lonely in her life, she is afraid of being put into a dormitory. Lynn, being naïve, cared for her as her little sister and understands what she is going through. Though Sophie has a mother, she does not feel any motherly love from her. After the incident her pet squirrel Louie, Sophie changed her attitude towards Lynn and become friendly with her. She usually carries a doll around with her, the only gift she received from her mother on her birthday.

Jeanne is Sophie's mother. Threatened by Lynn's closeness with the Countess Montgomery, she used her own daughter to make sure that they will be the ones to inherit the Countess' inheritance, frequently threatening Sophie to return her to a dormitory.

Vivian is the captain of Saint Patrick Academy girls' equestrian club. She is renowned as the "queen" of horseback riding because of her outstanding performance in horsemanship and is admired by her peers. Strict and exacting, she is a gifted equestrienne. She is the former rider of Andrews and current rider of Elizabeth. Threatened by Lynn's popularity when she managed to tame Andrews, Vivian treats Lynn harshly. Her feeling of dislike for Lynn is further fueled when she notices that Edward is more interested in Lynn than in her. She allied herself with Mary, who also resented Lynn for ruining her mother's marriage arrangement and to become one of the nobility classes. After the accident, Vivian's attitude towards Lynn gradually changes and began to accept her and even support her in her struggles. She is often accompanied by her entourages Phyllis and Matilda.

Phyllis is a classmate and friend of Vivian and Matilda. She is a member of girls' equestrian club. Like Vivian, Phyllis and Matilda are discontented with Lynn thinking that they will be outdone by a junior who is not affiliated with them.

Matilda is the bespectacled friend of Vivian and Phyllis. She is a member of girls' equestrian club.

Catherine or Cathy, is Vivian's close cousin. She is a transferred first-year student and a newest member of the girls' equestrian club in Saint Patrick Academy. Keen and intelligent, she is a talented equestrienne and only first-year allowed to ride Elizabeth. Unlike her cousin, she sees Lynn as a good friend and a commendable rival. She is also competing for the tournament championship and for the Lady Crest.

Philip is the captain of the St. Patrick Academy boys' equestrian club and an acquaintance of Edward. Like Edward, he is good-looking and a skilled equestrian. He occasionally hangs around at girls' equestrian club's premises to see Vivian practicing. He has feelings for Vivian though he does not want to admit it to her, knowing that she has feelings for Edward.

Lynn's friend and classmate. She is also a member of equestrian club.

Also Lynn's friend and classmate. She is quite timid around people. She recently joined the equestrian club.

Suzie is one of Lynn's classmate and a member of school's disciplinary committee. She is also a member of tennis club, and Mary's underclassman. She is quite discontented with Lynn after the incident with Andrews and the attention she is getting.

His name was not mentioned in the series; he is the headmaster of Saint Patrick Academy. He is an old acquaintance of Countess Isabel Montgomery and her late husband.

Eric is Paul and Suzie's older brother. Ever since their parents died, he has been running a small shop to support his younger siblings.

Paul is Eric's younger brother and one of Lynn's friends.

Nancy is Eric and Paul's younger sister.

Peggy is the daughter of a general store's owner, and one of Lynn's friends.

Henry is the household butler and chauffeur working at Montgomery Mansion. Aside his job, he is also knowledgeable about horseback riding, training and helping Lynn at home to further improve her skills with Andrews.

She is the maid working at Montgomery Mansion.

Jim is the shaggy coach employed by the headmaster to teach horseback riding at Saint Patrick Academy's both boys and girls equestrian clubs. Despite his looks, he is young and good at equestrian skills.

Barbara is a skilled equestrienne from another school and an acquaintance of Cathy. She first appeared on episode 14, as one of the observing spectators during Lynn and Cathy's preliminary competition for the Junior Grand Nationals. Like the two, Barbara is also competing for tournament together with her friends Betty and Anne.

Betty is the freckled blonde equestrienne and a friend of Barbara and Anne. She is another competitor participating in the tournament finals.

Anne is an equestrienne from another school and a bespectacled friend of Barbara and Betty. Like her friends, she is also competing in the tournament finals.

Mary is the daughter of Baroness Magdalene Wavebury and granddaughter of Victor Reynolds. She appeared on episode 22 and continued to the latter half of the series. Mary returned from Switzerland and is enrolled at Saint Patrick Academy, after learning that Lynn is also studying there. She resented Lynn for ruining her mother's marriage arrangement three years ago and to become one of the nobility classes, and wants to take revenge by manipulating misfortunes that befall on her and use it to her advantage. She joined the tennis club, being a skilled tennis player. Like other girls in the academy, she also aiming for the Lady Crest. Though Vivian allied herself with her, Mary has other plans of her own. She will do anything to eliminate her rivals from obtaining the Lady Crest, even putting others in harm's way.

Victor is the chairman of one of Britain's largest company. He is Magdalene's father and, Thomas and Mary's grandfather, subtly he wants to buy the Marble Mansion after the arson fire it happened and he dislikes George because of the incident of Baroness made her hating London along with Thomas.
Narrator

List of episodes

Music
Opening Theme

Lyrics by Mitsuko Shiramine
Composition by Ryo Matsuda
Arrangement by Keiichi Oku
Performed by Kaori Moritani
Courtesy of Columbia Records

Ending Theme

Lyrics by Mitsuko Shiramine
Composition by Masae Nanbu
Arrangement by Keiichi Oku
Performed by Kaori Moritani
Courtesy of Columbia Records

Staff
Director: Hiroshi Shidara
Producer: Kazuo Yokoyama, Hiromi Seki
Episode Director: Toshihiko Arisako, Yasuo Yamayoshi
Character Design: Kazuhiro Ochi
Art Design: Takao Sawada
Storyline: Tomoko Konparu
Planning: Hiromi Seki, Kazuo Yokoyama
Production Manager: Yoshiro Sugawara
Music: Kōhei Tanaka
Production Company: Toei Animation Co., Ltd., Toei Advertising, Ltd.

External links
Toei Animation's Official Website: Hello! Lady Lynn 
Author's Official Website: リンのマーブル館 
TOEI Animation Europe: Hello! Lady Lynn 

1988 anime television series debuts
1989 Japanese television series endings
Anime series based on manga
Historical anime and manga
Toei Animation television
TV Tokyo original programming
Television shows set in England
fr:Gwendoline (anime)
ja:ハロー!レディリン